The 1937 Delaware State Hornets football team represented the State College for Colored Students—now known as Delaware State University—in the 1937 college football season as an independent. They won their only game 13–6 against Lincoln (PA).

Schedule

References

Delaware State
Delaware State Hornets football seasons
College football undefeated seasons
Delaware State Hornets football